Liebenstein Castle may refer to castles in Germany:

 Liebenstein Castle (Thuringia)
 Liebenstein Castle (Rhine)
 Liebenstein Castle (Saxony)